Amir Rešić (22 January 1964 – 18 October 2007), known by the stage name Nino, was a Bosnian singer, popular in the 1990s.

Biography
Amir Rešić was born into a Bosnian Muslim family and raised in Bosanska Dubica, SR Bosnia and Herzegovina, but after his studies he moved to Kruševac, SR Serbia.

Career
With the stage name Nino, he became a leading pop folk singer in ex-Yugoslavia with several hit songs released in the 1990s. Off of his 1993 album, Zbogom Mala, all of his songs were hits even getting a VHS music video album release. His first album, Žena Je Žena, came out in 1991 with publisher PGP-RTB and his second album, Što Mi Noći Nemaju Svanuća, was released in 1993—along with his third album Zbogom Mala. His second album had 10 songs: "Što Mi Noći Nemaju Svanuća", "Moja Draga Prevari Me", "Samo Reci Da", "Oči Su Moje Mutne Od Dima", "Sudbina Zla", "Mangup", "Noć Ne Noćim", "Obriši Se Suzo Sama", "Pevaj Pevaj Srce Moje", "Dodelio Mi Život Tugu". Fourth album Šta Ću Mala S' tobom (1994, PGP-RTS) had 7 music videos: "Šta Ću Mala S' Tobom", "Udahni Duboko", "Sunce Nek Potamni", "Donesi Divlje Mirise", "Oči Bez Sjaja", "Bolje Da Te Nisam Ni Poljubio", "Zasviraće Sve Gitare"; all of them were smash hits and were circulating non-stop on Yugoslavian TV networks. This is when his musical career started to advance more. In 1995 he released 9 music videos: "Tvoje Oči", "Otrovana Grehom", "Nije Meni", "Idi Moram Da Ti Kažem", "Kasnije Il' Pre", "Pesma Prijatelju", "Ljubav Od Mastila", "Pesma Prijatelju", "Divlja Devojka" (the latter featuring Dragana Mirković as a duet).

Personal life
After moving to the Serbian city Kruševac in the 1980s, Rešić converted from Islam to Serbian Orthodoxy and changed his Muslim name Amir to the Christian Nikola, as his then-wife followed the Serbian Orthodox faith. He converted back to Islam in 2004 and changed his name back to Amir.

Rešić was married and divorced three times, with the marriages resulting in daughters Amela, Sandra and Tamara. Sandra Rešić competed in the 2014–15, 2015–16 and 2016–17 seasons of the televised singing competition Zvezde Granda.

Death
Rešić complained of severe stomach pain on the morning of 18 October 2007 and was taken to a Bijeljina hospital by friend Siniša Kajmaković, manager of the Bijeljina-based record label Renome. Rešić soon left the hospital, against doctors recommendations, fearing the reaction of the media to his illness.

Throughout the day, Rešić complained of intense pain, and at 10 PM an ambulance was called. Rešić lost consciousness during the ride to the hospital and attempts at resuscitation were unsuccessful. He died that night aged 43 of pancreas perforation caused by prolonged alcoholism.

Discography

Studio albums:

 Car (1991)
 Što Mi Noći Nemaju Svanuća (1992)
 Zbogom Mala (1993)
 Šta Ću Mala S Tobom (1994)
 Tvoje Oči (1995)
 Tebe Želim Noćas (1996)
 Za Prošlu Ljubav (1997)
 Ko Te Samo Takne (1998)
 Tebi Ravno Sve Do Mora (1999)
 Trebaš Mi (2000)
 12 Meseci (2001)
 Opet Onaj Stari (2004)
 Novembar 05 (2005)
 1 Na 1 (2006)

Compilations:

 Usne vrele kao žar (ZaM, 1993)
 Hitovi (Diskos, 1995)
 Hitovi (ZaM, 2004)

References

1964 births
2007 deaths
People from Dubica, Bosnia and Herzegovina
20th-century Bosnia and Herzegovina male singers
Bosnia and Herzegovina folk-pop singers
Bosnia and Herzegovina turbo-folk singers
BN Music artists
20th-century Serbian male singers
21st-century Serbian male singers
Alcohol-related deaths in Bosnia and Herzegovina
Bosniaks of Bosnia and Herzegovina
Bosnia and Herzegovina Muslims
Converts to Islam from Eastern Orthodoxy
Converts to Eastern Orthodoxy from Islam